Play of the Week may refer to:

ITV Play of the Week, British TV anthology series broadcast from 1956 to 1966
The Play of the Week, American TV anthology series broadcast from 1959 to 1961

See also
Play of the Month, British TV anthology series broadcast from 1965 to 1983